The 1946–47 season was the Tri-Cities Blackhawks' inaugural season in the National Basketball League (NBL). The team began play as the Buffalo Bisons, based in Buffalo, New York, but moved mid-season (after only 13 games) to Moline, Illinois, becoming the Tri-Cities Blackhawks.

Roster

 Head Coach: Nat Hickey

Regular season
The Buffalo Bisons won its first game 50–39  over the Syracuse Nationals on November 8, 1946. The team's last Buffalo appearance was a 50–38 loss to the Sheboygan Red Skins on December 16. The Bisons left town for a December road trip with their future in doubt; the team struggled to draw crowds in Buffalo, and  two of their scheduled home games were canceled. On December 25, it was announced that the franchise was moving to Moline, where they finished the season as the Tri-Cities Blackhawks. The Blackhawks missed the postseason with a 19–25 record (5–8 in Buffalo and 14–17 in Moline).

Eastern Division standings

Playoffs
Did not qualify

Awards and records
None

References

Atlanta Hawks seasons
Tri-Cities